Moldova Steel Works is a steel-producing company in Rîbnița, Transnistria. It accounts more than half of Transnistrian industrial output.

Moldova Steel Works was founded in 1985 for reprocessing of scrap metal. In 1998, majority of its shares was sold to Russian energy company Itera and 28.8% of shares was given to the employees of the company. Production peaked in 2000. In 2004, acquired 90% of shares was acquired by Hares Group of Hares Youssef. Moldova Steel Works became owned by group of Russian–Ukrainian oligarchs, including in addition to Hares Youssef also Hryhoriy Surkis, Ihor Kolomoyskyi, Alisher Usmanov, Vadym Novynskyi and Rinat Akhmetov. Later the Russian company Metalloinvest controlled by Alisher Usmanov and Vasily Anisimov became owner of the company. In 2015, the ownership was returned to the Transnistrian authorities for a symbolic price.

On 14 May 2018, Ukrainian government included Moldova Steel Works in the list of sanctioned companies, but excluded it from the list on 19 March 2019 after the Moldovan prime minister Pavel Filip's request.

The initial annual production capacity of the company was 684,000 tonnes of crude steel and 500,000 tonnes of rolled products. Later the capacity was reported to be is around 1,000,000 tonnes of steel and 1,000,000 tonnes of rolled products.  In 2018, it produced almost 502,900 tonnes of steel and 497,900 tonnes of rolled goods.

References

External links
 

Companies of Transnistria
Steel companies of Moldova
Iron and steel mills
Rîbnița
Steel companies of the Moldavian Soviet Socialist Republic
1985 establishments in the Soviet Union